John Lambie "Ian" Ormond (5 August 1949 – 8 October 2021) was an association football player who represented New Zealand at international level.

Biography
Ormond was born in Harthill, Scotland, on 5 August 1949, and migrated with his family to New Zealand in 1961. He became a naturalised New Zealand citizen in 1975.

Ormond scored a hat-trick on his full All Whites debut in a 4–1 win over New Caledonia on 17 September 1971 and ended his international playing career with ten A-international caps and five goals to his credit, his final cap an appearance in a 1–0 loss to Australia on 2 March 1976.

Ormond was from good football pedigree: his uncle Willie Ormond represented Scotland at the 1954 FIFA World Cup as a player and the 1974 FIFA World Cup as manager, while his father Bert Ormond and brother Duncan Ormond also represented New Zealand, as did Duncan's daughter Vicki Ormond.

Ormond died in Auckland on 8 October 2021.

References 

1949 births
2021 deaths
New Zealand association footballers
New Zealand international footballers
Stop Out players
Scottish emigrants to New Zealand
Naturalised citizens of New Zealand
Footballers from North Lanarkshire
Association football forwards
North Shore United AFC players